Jipijapa is a Quito Metro station. It was officially inaugurated opened on 21 December 2022 as part of the inaugural section of the system between Quitumbe and El Labrador. After the official inauguration, the system functions in the testing regime. The station is located between El Labrador and Iñaquito.

This is an underground station. The estimated daily number of passengers would be 53 thousands. The station has access for disabled passengers. It also has escalators. The station is painted in blue color.

The station is located at the intersection of Avenida Amazonas, Avenida Juan de Ascaray, and Avenida Tomas de Berlanga, next to Plaza de Toros.

The construction was completed on 31 March 2021, after which the process of transfer of the station to the city was started, and the process was completed on 2 May 2021. On 23 January 2023, the first train with 600 passengers to whom invitations were extended, arrived to the station.

References

Quito Metro
2022 establishments in Ecuador
Railway stations opened in 2022